Omar Laquon Regan (born June 12, 1975) is an American stand-up comedian, actor and former musician.

Early life
Regan was born in Detroit, Michigan, United States and was raised in Highland Park, Michigan to African American parents. Regan did not know his biological father. When he was five years old, his mother, Toya Monet Regan (born 1952), converted to Islam from Christianity, and married Iman Lufman Ayman Abdullahi (born Christopher Thomas in 1956). Subsequently, Regan was raised as a Muslim.

Music career
Regan started his career as a musician and started writing songs at the age of nine. He formed the group S.O.A (Servants of Allah) with his brother at the age of 11 and performed their first show at the age of 12. They opened for artists including Redman, Method Man, Wu-Tang Clan, KRS-One, Royce da 5'9", Proof, and Eminem.

In 1999, they were offered a single record deal with Tommy Boy Records but turned it down in hope of a better contract. However, no deal was made and the brothers focused on solo careers.

Stand up career
At the age of 19, Regan moved to Los Angeles to pursue a career in stand-up comedy and acting. In November 1999, while auditioning for different film roles, he first performed stand-up comedy at local Detroit comedy clubs.

In 2005, Regan was on the main stage at The World Famous Comedy Store in Hollywood and got the attention of talents scouts, soon after he appeared on E!'s reality series, Fight for Fame. He won and signed a year theatrical contract with Hollywood agency ACME Talent Agency. The new show did not get picked up for a second season and a year later and Regan was representing himself once again.

He is a regular performer in "FUNATICAL: Taking Comedy to the Extreme's We Come in Peace" tour. He has performed stand up at events across the world including the Global Peace and Unity Event in London, MuslimFest in Ontario, and Mercy Mission's Twins of Faith Conference.

Acting career
Regan is most known for doubling Chris Tucker in Rush Hour 2. He has since appeared in films including Internet Dating and Life is Hot in Cracktown.

He also co-founded a production company called BaniAdam Productions.

In 2015, he starred alongside Baba Ali in the film American Sharia as part of his Halalywood project.

Other activities
Regan is a member of the Canadian Dawah Association as a Program Developer for Celebrity Relations.

Regan also works as a motivational and public speaker, delivering his talk entitled "From Hollywood To Hajj". He visits schools and conducts family counseling and marriage workshops.

Comedy style
The Islamic World International Conference states that Regan uses entertainment and humor to promote tolerance and diversity, and aims to build bridges across racial, religious, and social divides.

Personal life
Regan got married at the age of 17 and got married again at the age of 19, he has three children from his first two marriages. At the age of 20, Regan divorced both his wives. In 1999, Regan left Detroit for California. Regan described this "as a very hard and an expensive move and slept at Grand Central bus station for some nights or sometimes there were friends in the same acting boat as me, so they would share their floor with me." He raised his three children alone for four and a half years in a one bedroom apartment in Hollywood.

Since 2003, Regan has lived in Los Angeles, California. In December 2007 and 2008, Regan performed Hajj (the largest Islamic pilgrimage to Mecca, Saudi Arabia).

On October 28, 2009, Regan's step-father Imam Luqman Ameen Abdullah, 53, Imam and prayer leader of Masjid Al-Haqq in Detroit, was shot twenty times and killed during an FBI raid of a warehouse in Dearborn, Michigan. Along with 10 other men, he was suspected of charges that included conspiracy to sell stolen goods, illegal possession and sale of firearms, mail fraud and altering numbers on license plates. Regan publicly denounced the government's actions.

Filmography

See also
African American
Islamic humour
Lists of African Americans
List of American Muslims

References

External links

Omar Regan on The Huffington Post
Omar Regan on Laugh Stub
An Interview with Omar Regan. SuhaibWebb.com. December 8, 2009

1975 births
Living people
African-American Muslims
Converts to Islam
African-American male actors
21st-century American male actors
African-American male comedians
American male comedians
American stand-up comedians
American impressionists (entertainers)
Muslim male comedians
African-American male singers
American male singers
American motivational speakers
African-American film directors
African-American screenwriters
HuffPost writers and columnists
Film directors from Michigan
Male actors from Detroit
Screenwriters from Michigan
21st-century American comedians
21st-century American singers